Hemidactylus thayene is a species of gecko. It is endemic to Myanmar.

References

Hemidactylus
Reptiles described in 2007
Reptiles of Myanmar
Endemic fauna of Myanmar